The 1973 Royal Air Maroc Sud Aviation Caravelle crash occurred on December 22, 1973 when a Sobelair Sud Aviation Caravelle SE-210 (operating for Royal Air Maroc) crashed near Tangier, Morocco. All 106 people on board were killed.

Aircraft 
The aircraft was a 12-year-old Sud Aviation Caravelle SE-210 VI-N. Its maiden flight was on February 23, 1961 (its test registration was F-WJAN), and it was delivered to Sobelair five days later, where it was re-registered as OO-SRD.

Accident 
The aircraft was leased to Royal Air Maroc to operate a passenger flight from Paris, France, to Casablanca, Morocco, with a stopover in Tangier. Most of the 98 passengers were Moroccan students and workers, as well as French tourists traveling to Morocco for Christmas. Nearly all of the eight crew members were Belgian, except for one Moroccan flight attendant. The aircraft approached runway 28 at Tangier-Boukhalef Airport at night in rainy weather. During the approach, the aircraft made a delayed turn and entered a mountainous area. The flight was then cleared to land and the aircraft resumed its descent. It was the deadliest aviation disaster to occur in Morocco until the Agadir air disaster in 1975. It remains the deadliest aviation disaster involving a Belgian airline and is the second deadliest accident involving a Sud Aviation Caravelle, behind Sterling Airways Flight 296.

See also 

 American Airlines Flight 965

References

External links 

  

Tanger-Tetouan-Al Hoceima
1973 in Morocco
Accidents and incidents involving the Sud Aviation Caravelle
Royal Air Maroc accidents and incidents
Aviation accidents and incidents in Morocco
Aviation accidents and incidents in 1973
Airliner accidents and incidents involving controlled flight into terrain
December 1973 events
Airliner accidents and incidents caused by pilot error
1973 disasters in Morocco